Arcade Building may refer to:

in Canada
 Arcade Building (Toronto), Toronto, Canada

in the United States
(by state)
 Arcade Building (Fort Pierce, Florida), listed on the National Register of Historic Places (NRHP) in Florida
 Arcade Building (Riverside, Illinois), listed on the NRHP in Illinois
 Arcade Building (Brookline, Massachusetts), listed on the NRHP in Massachusetts
 Arcade Building (St. Louis, Missouri), listed on the NRHP in Missouri
 Arcade Building (Asheville, North Carolina), listed on the NRHP in Buncombe County, North Carolina
 Westminster Arcade, Providence, Rhode Island
 Arcade Building (Columbia, South Carolina), listed on the NRHP in South Carolina

See also
Arcade Hotel (disambiguation)